Delaire is a suburban community in New Castle County, Delaware, United States.

Delaire is located on a hilltop overlooking the Delaware River northeast of Bellefonte between U.S. Route 13 Business (Philadelphia Pike) and U.S. Route 13. It abuts Bellevue State Park and Stoney Creek. 

In 1980 it was described as being typical of the Brandywine Hundred: "solid, all masonry, all middle-class, mostly white-collar, and mostly Republican".

References 

Unincorporated communities in New Castle County, Delaware
Unincorporated communities in Delaware